Since the restoration of democracy in the British Virgin Islands in 1950, only a comparatively small number of persons have
been elected to political office.  Although elections are held approximately every three or four years, the small size of the legislative body and the tendency to return incumbent politicians has resulted in a relatively small aggregate number.

Prior to the 1967 general election legislators were elected on a non-party basis. However, many persons who were elected in those early elections later went on to form, or stand for, political parties.

In addition to politicians who were elected by popular mandate, various other political positions are filled by appointment. These include:
 The Governor of the British Virgin Islands
 The Attorney General of the British Virgin Islands
 The Speaker of the House of Assembly of the British Virgin Islands
 Prior to 1967, certain members of the Legislative Council (as the House of Assembly was formerly named) were appointed rather than elected.

List of elected politicians
A total of 64 people have been elected to serve in the Legislature of the British Virgin Islands; 56 were men, and eight were women. Of those 64, just over half (33) have only served a single term or less.

Longest serving elected politicians
Twelve people (all men) have served five or more terms in the British Virgin Islands Legislature.

See also
 List of political parties in the British Virgin Islands

Footnotes